The New Catholic Encyclopedia (NCE) is a multi-volume reference work on Roman Catholic history and belief edited by the faculty of The Catholic University of America. The NCE was originally published by McGraw-Hill in 1967. A second edition, which gave up the articles more reminiscent of a general encyclopedia, was published in 2002. 

It was intended by the faculty to become, like its predecessor the 1914 Catholic Encyclopedia, a standard reference work for students, teachers, librarians, journalists, and general readers interested in the history, doctrine, practices, and people of the Catholic faith. However, unlike its predecessor, its first edition also contained more general articles on science, education, and the liberal arts. The 2002 edition of the NCE was listed as one of Library Journals "Best Reference Sources" for 2003.

First edition
The original Catholic Encyclopedia was published between 1907 and 1914, first by the Robert Appleton Company, which was specifically created for that purpose, and then by its successor The Encyclopedic Press Inc. Supplements to the Catholic Encyclopedia were published in 1922 and in 1958. In 1960, the Catholic University of America, in collaboration with the McGraw-Hill Book Company, began work on what was planned as an entirely new encyclopedia, and seven years later (in 1967) published the 15-volume New Catholic Encyclopedia (NCE1). Alphabetic supplemental volumes appeared in 1974, 1979, 1989, and 1996.

Jubilee Volume 
In 2001, in collaboration with the Catholic University of America, Gale Publishing, a subsidiary  of the Thomson Corporation, published a Jubilee Volume: The Wojtyła Years, which focuses on the pontificate of Pope John Paul II and included thematic essays that covered the person, his work and pontificate in two parts:

 From the Poland of Karol Wojtyła to the World of John Paul II — Thematic Essays
 John Paul II and His Pontificate

The second part offers various sections (e.g. "Magisterial Documents", "People and Places, Institutions and Events"), the content for each of which is arranged with entries in alphabetical order.

At times listed as volume 20 of NCE1, it was envisioned by the editor "not so much as a supplement to the original edition as a propaedia, a preamble, to the revised edition of the NCE", which was to follow a year later. Some of the material of the Jubilee Volume appeared in later supplements, notably the 2010 supplement to NCE2 (see next section).

Second edition
The second edition of the NCE (NCE2), incorporating material from the original edition and its supplements, along with further additions and revisions, was published by Gale Publishing in 2002. It was published in fourteen volumes, with the fifteenth volume being a cumulative index to the entire encyclopedia. Later supplemental volumes appeared for this second edition.

In addition to the hundreds of new signed articles on a wide variety of topics, the second edition also featured biographies of contemporary religious figures; thousands of photographs, maps and illustrations; and some updated bibliographical citations. The photographs remained black and white.

Reviews
NCE2 received mixed reviews.  While applauding the effort, reviewers found the updating to be spotty, for example, many bibliographies were not updated, new notable buildings were omitted, and important new research results were not included. In addition, a large number of articles and 3.5 million words that appeared in NCE1 were omitted entirely. An editor, Berard Marthaler, said that the reduction in size "had to be done with a meat cleaver, not a scalpel." Controversial subjects were, to some extent, avoided in the second edition; for example, as Jan Malcheski and Herman Sutter both noted in their reviews, an article from the 1996 NCE1 supplement on pedophilia was omitted in the NCE2. The tone of the multi-author work was also variable, from older, scholarly articles such as the one on "Aristotle", to those pitched for a more general audience such as the article on "Joy".

Supplementation for the second edition

In the summer of 2006, the publisher, Gale, together with the Catholic University of America Press, developed a plan for ongoing updating of the second edition in both print and electronic (eBook) formats. The updating plan indicated a special focus on the United States. The planned new entries included biographies as well as articles on movements, organizations, documents and ideas that are either Catholic or of special interest to Catholics.

The first of these New Catholic Encyclopedia supplemental volumes, Supplement 2009 was published electronically in June 2009 and in print in November 2009. It focused on the theme of "Science and the Church", and contained such new articles as the ones on Charles Darwin and Sigmund Freud.  It also updated the articles on the Catholic Church in each of the fifty States, as well as the 33 US archdiocese articles. It contains a much updated bibliography. Most of the editors now belong to Catholic institutions other than the Catholic University of America.

Supplement 2010, published in June 2010, focused on the theme "Church in Modern History", with particular emphasis on World War II and thereafter.  It included about 200 entries on those beatified or canonized since 2003. Most of the beatified were new entries, while most of the Saints were revisions of previous articles, although overall the 2010 supplement had more new entries than revised (updated) ones.

Supplement 2011 focused on the theme "Church and the Arts and Music"; among its new article were one on the sex abuse crisis and one on Pope Benedict XVI, as well as new entries on St. Mary Helen McKillop (1842–1907) and St. Andre Bessette (1845–1937).

"Ethics and Philosophy" was the theme for the 2012-2013 supplement.

See also

Catholic Encyclopedia (1914)

Notes

Further reading
New Catholic Encyclopedia, 1st edition; 19 volumes (incl. four supplements), William McDonald (ed.) (McGraw-Hill Book Company in association with The Catholic University of America, 1967-1996).
New Catholic Encyclopedia, Jubilee Volume: The Wojtyła Years, Berard L. Marthaler (ed.) (Detroit: Gale Cengage Learning in association with The Catholic University of America, 2001).
New Catholic Encyclopedia, 2nd edition; 15 volumes (Detroit: Gale Cengage Learning in association with The Catholic University of America, 2003).
New Catholic Encyclopedia, 2nd edition, Supplement 2009 (Detroit: Gale Cengage Learning in association with The Catholic University of America, 2009).
New Catholic Encyclopedia, 2nd edition, Supplement 2010 (Detroit: Gale Cengage Learning in association with The Catholic University of America, 2010).
New Catholic Encyclopedia, 2nd edition, Supplement 2011, Robert L. Fastiggi (ed.) (Detroit: Gale Cengage Learning in association with The Catholic University of America, 2011).
New Catholic Encyclopedia, 2nd edition, Supplement 2012–2013; 4 volumes, Robert L. Fastiggi (ed.) (Detroit: Gale Cengage Learning in association with The Catholic University of America, 2013).

Cengage books
Christian encyclopedias
Publications established in 1967
McGraw-Hill books
20th-century encyclopedias